The Coeur d'Alene City Hall is a historic building in Coeur d'Alene, Idaho. It was built in 1908, and designed in the Renaissance Revival style by architect George Williams. It served as the de facto courthouse until the construction of the Kootenai County Courthouse in 1926, and it later housed the offices of city officials, police officers and firefighters. It has been listed on the National Register of Historic Places since August 3, 1979.

References

		
National Register of Historic Places in Kootenai County, Idaho
Renaissance Revival architecture in Idaho
Buildings and structures completed in 1908
Buildings and structures in Coeur d'Alene, Idaho